Sykes Glacier is a north-flowing glacier located just east of Plane Table in the Asgard Range, Victoria Land, Antarctica. Named by New Zealand Antarctic Place-Names Committee (NZ-APC) for New Zealand film director Jeremy Sykes who perished in a helicopter accident at nearby Mount McLennan, November 19, 1969.

Glaciers of the Asgard Range
McMurdo Dry Valleys